Börek or burek are a family of pastries or pies found in the Balkans, Middle East and Central Asia. The pastry is made of a thin flaky dough such as filo with a variety of fillings, such as meat, cheese, spinach, or potatoes. Boreks are mainly associated with Anatolia, the Middle East, Armenia, and also with the former Ottoman Empire, including the Balkans and the South Caucasus, Eastern European and Central European countries, Northern Africa and Central Asia. A borek may be prepared in a large pan and cut into portions after baking, or as individual pastries. They are usually baked but some varieties can be fried. Borek is sometimes sprinkled with sesame or nigella seeds, and it can be served hot or cold.

It is a custom of Sephardic Jews to have bourekas for their Shabbat breakfast meal on Saturday mornings. In Bosnia and Herzegovina it has become commonplace to have borek as a breakfast food with coffee. It is commonly served with afternoon tea in Bosnia and Herzegovina. It is commonly served with a yogurt drink in Serbia and North Macedonia.

Origin and names
The English name borek comes from Turkish  (Turkish pronunciation: [bœˈɾec]), while burek is the form used in the countries of the former Yugoslavia. Other variants include byrek, in Albania; boureki in Greece; byurek in Bulgaria; brik in Tunisia; and burekas in Israel.

The Persian word bureh goes back to the Middle Persian *bōrak. This word ultimately goes back to the Proto-Indo-European root *bher- which meant "to carve, cut, split". The name of another pastry, shekarbura, is also borrowed from the same Persian word. Nişanyan noted the possibility of Turkic origin for the Persian word.

Borek may have its origins in Persian or Turkish cuisine and may be one of its most significant and, in fact, ancient elements of the Turkish cuisine, having been developed in Central Asia before some westward migration to Anatolia in the late Middle Ages, or by nomadic Turks of central Asia some time before the seventh century. Another popular theory posits that it may be a descendant of the pre-existing Eastern Roman (Byzantine) Anatolian dish en tyritas plakountas (Byzantine Greek: εν τυρίτας πλακούντας) "cheesy placenta", itself a descendant of placenta, the classical baked layered dough and cheese dish of Ancient Roman cuisine.

The dish was a popular element of Ottoman cuisine, and may have been invented at the Ottoman court, though there are also indications it was made among Central Asian Turks; other versions may date to the Classical era of the eastern Mediterranean.

One alternative etymological origin that has been suggested is that the word comes from the Turkic root bur- 'to twist', but the sound harmony for this proposal would dictate the suffix "-aq", and Turkic languages in Arabic orthography invariably write  with an ك not an ق, which weighs against this origin.

Regional variants
Even though borek is very popular in the cuisines of the former Ottoman Empire, especially in North Africa and throughout the Balkans, it originated in Anatolia. Borek is also part of Mizrahi and Sephardic Jewish traditions. They have been enthusiastically adopted by the Ottoman Jewish communities, and have been described—along with boyos de pan and bulemas—as forming "the trio of preeminent Ottoman Jewish pastries".

Turkish variants

The word "börek" in Turkish can be modified by a descriptive word referring to the shape, ingredients of the pastry, or a specific region where it is typically prepared, as in the above kol böreği, su böreği, talaş böreği or Sarıyer böreği. There are many variations of börek in Turkish cuisine:

Balkans

In the former Yugoslavia, burek, also known as pita in Bosnia and Herzegovina, is an extremely common dish, made with yufka. This kind of pastry is also popular in Croatia, where it was imported by Croats of Bosnia and Herzegovina and Albanians. In Serbia, Albania, Kosovo, Croatia, Montenegro, North Macedonia and Slovenia, burek is made from layers of dough, alternating with layers of other fillings in a circular baking pan and then topped with a last layer of dough. Traditionally it may be baked with no filling (prazan, meaning empty), with stewed minced meat and onions, or with cheese. Modern bakeries offer cheese and spinach, meat, apple, sour cherries, potato, mushroom, and other fillings. It is often eaten along with a plain yoghurt drink.

Zeljanica is a spinach burek common in Bosnia and Herzegovina.

Albania 

In Albania, this dish is called . In Kosovo and few other regions byrek is also known as "pite". Byrek is traditionally made with several layers of dough that have been thinly rolled out by hand. The final form can be small, individual triangles, especially from street vendors called 'Byrektore' which sell byrek and other traditional pastries and drinks.  It can also be made as one large byrek that is cut into smaller pieces. There are different regional variations of byrek. It can be served cold or hot.

The most common fillings include: cheese (especially gjizë, salted curd cheese), ground meat and onions (ragù style filling), spinach and eggs, milk and eggs with pre-baked dough layers, but it can also be made with tomato and onions, peppers and beans, potato or a sweet filling of pumpkin, nettles (known as byrek me hithra), or kidney beans (popular in winter).

Lakror is an Albanian pie dish from southern Albania. The pie is sometimes called a type of byrek pastry. Lakror is generally filled with a variety of greens or meats. Another related dish is Fli, typical from the North of Albania and Kosovo. It is made up of layers of a flour and water batter, cream and butter. Traditionally, it is baked on embers like lakror.

Bosnia and Herzegovina 

In 2012, Lonely Planet included the Bosnian burek in their "The World's Best Street Food" book. Eaten for any meal of the day, in Bosnia and Herzegovina the burek is a meat-filled pastry, traditionally rolled in a spiral and cut into sections for serving. The same spiral filled with cottage cheese is called sirnica, with spinach and cheese zeljanica, with potatoes krompiruša, and all of them are generically referred to as pita. Eggs are used as a binding agent when making sirnica and zeljanica.

Bulgaria 
The Bulgarian version of the pastry, locally called byurek, is typically regarded as a variation of banitsa, a similar Bulgarian dish. Bulgarian byurek is a type of banitsa with sirene cheese, the difference being that byurek also has eggs added.

In Bulgarian, byurek has also come to be applied to other dishes similarly prepared with cheese and eggs, such as chushka byurek, a peeled and roasted pepper filled with cheese, and tikvichka byurek, blanched or uncooked bits of squash with eggs filling.

Greece 

In Greece, boureki or bourekaki, and Cyprus poureki (in the Greek dialects of the island) are small pastries made with phyllo dough or with pastry crust. Pastries in the börek family are also called pita (pie): tiropita, spanakopita, and so on. Galaktoboureko is a syrupy phyllo pastry filled with custard, common throughout Greece and Cyprus. In the Epirus, σκερ-μπουρέκ (derives from the Turkish şeker-börek, "sugar-borek") is a small rosewater-flavoured marzipan sweet. Bougatsa (Greek is a Greek variation of a borek which consists of either semolina custard, cheese, or minced meat filling between layers of phyllo, and is said to originate in the city of Serres, an art of pastry brought with the immigrants from Constantinople and is most popular in Thessaloniki, in the Central Macedonia region of Northern Greece. Serres achieved the record for the largest puff pastry on 1 June 2008. It weighed 182.2 kg, was 20 metres long, and was made by more than 40 bakers. In Venetian Corfu, boureki was also called burriche, and filled with meat and leafy greens. The Pontian Greek piroski (πιροσκί) derives its name from borek too. It is almost identical in name and form to pirozhki (Russian: пирожки), which is of Slavic origin, and popular in Russia and further east.

Serbia 

The recipe for "round" burek was developed in the Serbian town of Niš. In 1498, it was introduced by a famous Turkish baker, Mehmed Oğlu from Istanbul. Eventually burek spread from the southeast (southern Serbia, Kosovo and North Macedonia) to the rest of Yugoslavia. Niš hosts an annual burek competition and festival called Buregdžijada. In 2005, a 100 kg (220 lbs) burek was made, with a diameter of 2 metres (≈6 ft) and it is considered to have been the world biggest burek ever made.

Slovenia 
In Slovenia, burek is one of the most popular fast-food dishes, but at least one researcher found that it is viewed negatively by Slovenes due to their prejudices towards immigrants, especially those from other countries of former Yugoslavia. A publication of a diploma thesis on this at the Faculty of Social Sciences of the University of Ljubljana in 2010 stirred controversy regarding the appropriateness of the topic. The mentor of the student that had written the thesis described the topic as legitimate and burek as denoting primitive behaviour in Slovenia in spite of it being by his account "sophisticated food". He explained the controversy as a good example of the conclusions of the student. In 2008, an employee of the Scientific Research Centre of the Slovenian Academy of Sciences and Arts (SRC SASA) had attained his PhD degree with a thesis on meta-burek at the University of Nova Gorica.

Other countries

Algeria 

In Algeria, this dish is called bourek, a delicious roll of pastry sheet stuffed with meat, onions, and spice, is one of the main appetizers of Algerian cuisine.

It's a starter served when receiving guests and especially during Ramadan evenings during the round meal of the holy month, usually accompanied by Algerian Chorba or Harira. Other forms include bourek packed with chicken and onions, shrimp and béchamel sauce, or a vegetarian alternative usually made of mashed potatoes and spinach.

Another Algerian variant of Bourek is called Brik or Brika, a speciality of Algeria's east, notably Annaba. It is a savory entree made from brik leaf, stuffed with mashed potatoes and a mixture of minced meat, onions, cheese and parsley. The whole is topped with a seasoned raw egg which cooks once the sheet of brik has been folded and soaked in boiling oil.

Armenia 
In Armenia, byorek (բյորեկ) or borek (բորեկ) consists of dough, or filo dough, folded into triangles and stuffed with spinach, onions and feta cheese or ground beef.

Israel 

Burekas have long been part of Sephardic cuisine were introduced to Israel by Sephardic Jews who settled there. Burekas can be filled with various fillings, although meat is less common in Israel because of the Jewish dietary restrictions. Most burekas in Israel are made with margarine-based doughs rather than butter-based doughs so that (at least the non-cheese–filled varieties) can be eaten along with either milk meals or meat meals in accordance with the kosher prohibition against mixing milk and meat at the same meal. The most popular fillings are salty cheese, spinach, eggplant, and mashed potato, with other fillings including mushrooms, sweet potato, chickpeas, olives, mallows, swiss chard, and pizza flavor.

Libya 
Known in Libya as brik, it is also a popular dish in Libya.

Moldova and Romania 
The regional cuisine of the Moldavian West bank of the Pruth still yields a type of dumpling-like food called burechiuşe (sometimes called burechiţe) which is described as dough in the shape of a ravioli-like square which is filled with mushrooms such as Boletus edulis, and sealed around its edges and then tossed and subsequently boiled in borscht like soups or chorbas. They are traditionally eaten in the last day of fasting at the time of the Christmas Eve. It is not clear if the burechiuşe derive their name from the Turco-Greek börek (which is a distinct possibility given the fact that Moldavia was ruled for many decades by dynasties of Greek Phanariotes and that encouraged Greek colonists to settle in the area), so at the receiving end of cultural and culinary influences coming from them, or it takes its name from that of the mushroom Boletus (burete in its Romanian language rhotacised version, and it meant "mushroom" as well as "sponge") by the pattern of the ravioli, which were named after the Italian name of the turnip with which they were once filled.

In Romania, the plăcintă is considered a variation of the phyllo-wrapped pie, with the dough traditionally stuffed with cheese. In Dobruja, an eastern territory that used to be a Turkish province, one can find both the Turkish influence—plăcintă dobrogeană either filled with cheese or with minced meat and served with sheep yoghurt or the Tatar street food Suberek—a deep fried half Moon cheese filled dough.

Saudi Arabia 
In Saudi Arabia, Burēk, is usually made in the Hejaz region of western Saudi Arabia, it mostly resembles the Bosnian rolled burek but can also come in other variants, and it is stuffed with minced meat or with salty cheese and dill. It's usually served during the month of Ramadan, same goes to samosas.

Tunisia 

In Tunisia, there is a variant known as the brik that consists of thin crepe-like pastry around a filling and is commonly deep fried. The best-known is the egg brik, a whole egg in a triangular pastry pocket with chopped onion, tuna, harissa and parsley. The Tunisian brik is also very popular in Israel, due to the large Tunisian Jewish population there. It is often filled with a raw egg and herbs or tuna, harissa, and olives, and it is sometimes served in a pita. This is also known as a boreeka.

See also

 List of ancient dishes and foods
 List of pastries
 Zelnik
 Banitsa
 Bierock
 Boyoz
 Gibanica
 Pastel
 Pirog
 Pirozhki
 Samosa
 Mongolian Khuushuur

References

Albanian cuisine
Algerian cuisine
Ancient dishes
Armenian cuisine
Assyrian cuisine
Austrian cuisine
Balkan cuisine
Belarusian cuisine
Bulgarian cuisine
Central Asian cuisine
Croatian cuisine
Cypriot cuisine
Czech cuisine
Egyptian cuisine
Estonian cuisine
German cuisine
Greek pastries
Hungarian cuisine
Iraqi cuisine
Israeli cuisine
Jewish cuisine
Jordanian cuisine
Kosovan cuisine
Latvian cuisine
Lebanese cuisine
Libyan cuisine
Macedonian cuisine
Maltese cuisine
Mediterranean cuisine
Montenegrin cuisine
Moroccan cuisine
Ottoman cuisine
Palestinian cuisine
Polish cuisine
Romanian cuisine
Russian cuisine
Savoury pies
Serbian cuisine
Slovak cuisine
Slovenian cuisine
Stuffed dishes
Syrian cuisine
Tunisian cuisine
Turkish tea culture
Ukrainian cuisine